Parenti  may refer to:

Parenti (surname)
Parenti, Calabria, a comune in the Province of Cosenza, Italy
Parenti, an incorrect spelling of Perentie, a species of Australian monitor lizard